Dodson is an unincorporated community in Montgomery County, in the U.S. state of Ohio.

History
Dodson was laid out in 1851 by B. H. Dodson, and named for him. The railroad arrived to Dodson in 1852. A post office was established at Dodson in 1853, and remained in operation until 1901.

References

Unincorporated communities in Montgomery County, Ohio
Unincorporated communities in Ohio